Rodney Piers "Sam" Bass (30 July 1944 – 28 June 2018) was an Australian politician who represented the South Australian House of Assembly seat of Florey for the Liberal Party from 1993 to 1997.

References

 

1944 births
2018 deaths
Members of the South Australian House of Assembly
Liberal Party of Australia members of the Parliament of South Australia
Australian police officers